West Gaoqiao is a Shanghai Metro station located on Line 10 within Pudong, Shanghai. Located near the intersection of Zhonggao Highway and Gangcheng Road, it was expected to open with the rest of the northern extension of Line 10 in 2018, however, due to construction delays, the station opened on 26 December 2020. It is an elevated station with side platforms.

References 

Railway stations in Shanghai
Shanghai Metro stations in Pudong
Line 10, Shanghai Metro
Railway stations in China opened in 2020